The Evening World was a newspaper that was published in New York City from 1887 to 1931. It was owned by Joseph Pulitzer, and served as an evening edition of the New York World.

History
The first issue was on October 10, 1887. It was published daily, except for Sunday. The final publication was on February 26, 1931. It was merged with New York World and the New York Telegram and became the New York World-Telegram.

In 1899, The Evening World was the subject of a large-scale newsboy strike, immortalized by the Disney film and stage musical Newsies.

Staff
Nixola Greeley-Smith had worked in St Louis before being based at The Evening World. She covered home front activities during World War I and was an advocate and activist for women's suffrage.

References

Evening
Publications established in 1887
Daily newspapers published in New York City